Ripsaw was a Top Spin ride at Alton Towers theme park in Staffordshire, England. It opened in 1997 and closed at the end of 2015.

History
The ride opened on 15 March, 1997 alongside The Blade (originally the pirate ship), which replaced Thunder Looper - a Schwarzkopf Shuttle Loop. It was closed in the 2015 season due to the park's long-term plan. It was replaced by Forbidden Sweep, a small carnival game, for the 2016 season and then was replaced by the temporary ride, Funk ‘n’ Fly.

Ride experience
Riders sat in a 20 seat wide, two tier gondola rotated by a pair of robotic arms and allowed to freely pivot. Riders were also suspended above jets of water at one point and were lowered towards it, similar to Rameses Revenge located in Chessington World of Adventures Resort. The ride was located in the Forbidden Valley section of the park adjacent to Nemesis.

References

External links
 Coasterforce's review of Ripsaw
 Ripsaw's page on the official Alton Towers website
 Ripsaw information page on TowersStreet

Amusement rides manufactured by HUSS Park Attractions
Alton Towers
1997 establishments in England
2015 disestablishments in England
Amusement rides introduced in 1997
Amusement rides that closed in 2015